Batsford is a patience or card solitaire similar to Klondike except that it uses two decks instead of one. The cards are turned up one at a time during a single pass through the deck, and there is also a reserve pile available for a single King.

Rules
The object of this game is to move all cards to the foundations.  There are eight foundations that build up from Ace to King in suit, (e.g. A♣, 2♣, 3♣, 4♣...) 

There are ten dêpôts in the tableau ranging from one to ten cards long, and which build down in alternating colors, (e.g. 10♠, 9♥, 8♠, 7♦...)  Cards in the tableu can be moved to a foundation or onto another tableau stack.  Only a King can be moved to an empty space.  

The layout also includes a single reserve pile where a single King can be held.  

The stock is turned up one card up at a time.  The topmost card can be moved to the foundations or the tableau.  Only one pass is allowed through the deck, making this an extremely hard game to win.

References
 Coops, Helen Leslie (1939). 100 Games of Solitaire. Whitman. 128 pp.
 Parlett, David (1979). The Penguin Book of Patience, London: Penguin.

See also
 Klondike
 List of patiences and solitaires
 Glossary of patience and solitaire terms

Double-deck patience card games
Mobile games
Simple packers